This is a list of aviation-related events from 1931:

Events 
 Bert Hinkler flies a de Havilland Puss Moth from Canada to New York City, then non-stop  to Jamaica, then on to British Guiana and Brazil. He then flies across the South Atlantic Ocean to West Africa in extremely bad weather, becoming the first person to fly across the South Atlantic solo and only the second person after Charles Lindbergh in 1927 to fly solo across the Atlantic. He completes his journey by flying from West Africa to London. For the flight, he receives the Segrave Trophy, the Johnston Memorial Prize, and the Britannia Trophy for the most meritorious flying performance of the year.
 Manufacturer Airspeed Ltd founded in York, England.
 Alexander Seversky founds the Seversky Aircraft Corporation.
 Watanabe Iron Works, the ancestor of the Kyūshū Airplane Company Ltd., begins to manufacture aircraft.
 First Bendix trophy race.
 The Imperial Japanese Navy decides to abolish its airship units and phase airships out of the fleet over the next few years.
 In New York City, the Empire State Building is completed, topped with a 200-foot (61-meter) mooring mast for airships. Plans to disembark airship passengers prove impractical, and the mast is never used except for a single three-minute contact by the United States Navy blimp J-4.
 U.S. Army Second Lieutenant William A. Cooke sets world gliding records for endurance and distance, flying an estimated 600 statute miles (966 km) in 21 hours 34 minutes 15 seconds at Wheeler Field, Territory of Hawaii.
 Summer 1931 – Transcontinental and Western Air moves its headquarters from New York City to Kansas City, Missouri.

January 
In the Soviet Union, construction of Leningrad's Shosseynaya Airport (the future Pulkovo Airport) begins.
 January 6 – Italian General Italo Balbo leads the first formation flight across the South Atlantic. Twelve Savoia-Marchetti S.55s fly from Portuguese Guinea to Brazil.
 January 7 – Guy Menzies flies the first solo non-stop trans-Tasman flight (from Australia to New Zealand) in 11 hours and 45 minutes, crash-landing his Avro Sports Avian on New Zealand's west coast.
 January 8 – Piarco Airport, the future Piarco International Airport, opens in Port-of-Spain, Trinidad.
 January 9 – The Pratt-MacArthur agreement defines the United States Navys naval air force as an element of the fleet that moves with the fleet and helps it carry out its missions. The agreement settles a lengthy controversy between the United States Army and the Navy over the role of naval aviation in overall national defense, as well as internal Navy debates over the role of naval air power.

February 
 Flying from Oran in French Algeria, the French aviators Antoine Paillard and Louis Mailloux fly a  circuit for over 50 hours in the Bernard 80 GR in an attempt to set a new unrefueled nonstop closed-circuit world distance record. They cover  before higher-than-expected fuel consumption forces them to land only  short of the record. 
 February 1 – Polish pilot Stanisław Skarżyński begins a  tour around Africa in a PZL Ł.2. He will complete it on May 5.
 February 12 – The Detroit News places an order for a Pitcairn PCA-2 autogiro with the Pitcairn Aircraft Company. It is the first commercial order for an autogiro in the United States.
 February 14 – The United States Congress authorizes a new award, the Air Mail Medal of Honor, which the President of the United States is to award to pilots who perform distinguished service in connection with U.S. Air Mail service. It will first be awarded in December 1933.
 February 21 – After a Pan American-Grace Airways (Panagra) Ford Trimotor lands at Rodríguez Ballón Airport at Arequipa, Peru, armed revolutionary soldiers surround it. They demand that it fly them to another destination, but the Trimotor's pilot refuses. The standoff continues for 10 days until, on 2 March, the soldiers suddenly announce that their side won the revolution and let the pilot go in exchange for him giving one of them a ride to Lima.
 February 26 – Imperial Airways begins scheduled services between England and Africa using Armstrong Whitworth Argosys.
The plane remains in the air for over 75 hours 23 minutes.

March 
 The French aviator Marcel Goulette flies a Farman F.304 trimotor from Paris, France, to Tananarive, Madagascar, and back.
 March 9 – Flying a Farman F.302, French aviators Jean Réginensi and Marcel Lalouette set new distance and duration records over a closed circuit with a 2,000-kilogram (4,409-pound) payload, flying  in 17 hours.
 March 21
Australia suffers its first airline disaster when the Australian National Airways Avro 618 Ten Southern Cloud disappears in bad weather over the Snowy Mountains in New South Wales, Australia, with the loss of all eight people on board. The aircrafts wreckage will not be discovered until October 26, 1958.
Zygmunt Puławski, one of Poland's leading aircraft designers, dies during the sixth flight of the PZL.12 flying boat prototype – which he designed and built – when the PZL.12 stalls after take-off due to a strong wind and crashes in Warsaw, Poland.
 March 26 – Ad Astra Aero and Balair merge to form Swissair.
 March 30–April 2 – Flying the Benard 80 GR, French aviators Jean Marmoz and Antoine Paillard set a new closed-circuit unrefueled flight distance record, covering  in a time of 52 hours 44 minutes. A loss of coolant finally brings the flight to an end, although during the last part of the flight the two men pump champagne, eau de Vittel, and coffee into the radiator to keep the engine cool.
 March 31 – A Transcontinental & Western Air Fokker F-10 crashes near Bazaar, Kansas, killing all eight on board, including American football coach Knute Rockne. The crash prompts the first grounding of an aircraft type, ordered by the United States Department of Commerce.

April 
 April 8 – Flying a Pitcairn PCA-2 over Willow Grove, Pennsylvania, Amelia Earhart sets an autogiro altitude record, reaching .
 April 10 – C. W. A. Scott breaks the record for the fastest solo flight from England to Australia, making the flight between April 1 and April 10 in a time of 9 days 4 hours 11 minutes.
 April 14 – Honduras founds its National Aviation School. It is the forerunner of the Honduran Air Force.
 April 21 – Pitcairn-Cierva Autogiro Company pilot Jim Ray lands a Pitcairn PCA-2 autogiro on the White House lawn in Washington, D.C., for a ceremony in which U.S. President Herbert Hoover presents the Collier Trophy to autogiro manufacturer Harold Pitcairn. After the ceremony, Ray takes off again in the PCA-2.

May 
 May 5 – Polish pilot Stanisław Skarżyński completes a  tour around Africa in a PZL Ł.2. He began the tour on February 1.
 May 14 – A de Havilland Gypsy Moth piloted by professional hunter Denys Finch Hatton and carrying his Kĩkũyũ servant Kamau takes off from the airfield at Voi, Kenya, circles the field twice, stalls, and crashes, killing both men.
 May 28
Walter E. Lees and Frederick Brossy set a new endurance record for a non-refueled flight, landing a Bellanca J2 Diesel aircraft at Jacksonville Beach, Florida, after remaining in the air continuously for 84 hours 32 minutes. The record will stand until July 1986.
 Flying the Pitcairn PCA-2 autogiro Missing Link, John M. Miller completes the first flight across the United States in a rotary-wing aircraft.

June 
 June 11 – The 40-passenger Handley Page H.P.42 four-engine biplane enters service with British airline Imperial Airways when G-AAGX Hannibal operates a Croydon Airport to Paris–Le Bourget flight, setting new standards of passenger service and comfort.
 June 23–July 1 – Wiley Post and Harold Gatty fly around the world in a Lockheed Vega, the Winnie Mae, covering  in 8 days 15 hours 51 minutes – a new record.

July 
 July 15 – The United States Army Corps's Air Corps Tactical School completes its relocation from Langley Field, Virginia, to Maxwell Field, Alabama.
 July 20 – The Boston and Maine Railroad and Maine Central Railroad found Boston-Maine Airways, the future Northeast Airlines. It flies from Boston, Massachusetts, to Bangor, Maine, via Portland, Maine, as a Pan American Airways contract carrier.
 July 22–September 1 – Sir Alan Cobham and crew make a  return flight between England and the Belgian Congo in a Short Valletta.
 July 27 – The Air Line Pilots Association, International is founded at a meeting in Chicago, Illinois.
It is the first known non-stop flight to surpass either 5,000 miles or 8,000 kilometers.

August 
 August 6 – Transcontinental and Western Air inaugurates the first air cargo service in the United States with a shipment of livestock from St. Louis, Missouri, to Newark, New Jersey.
 August 9 – After an engine separates from the American Airways Ford 5-AT-B Trimotor NC9662 shortly after takeoff from Cincinnati Municipal Airport in Cincinnati, Ohio, for a flight to Atlanta, Georgia, its pilot tries to return to the airport for an emergency landing. He misses the runway and then tries to land on the bank of the Little Miami River, but the aircraft strikes soft sand and noses over, killing all six people on board.
 August 29 – The German dirigible Graf Zeppelin pioneers the air route between Germany and Brazil.

September 
 The Royal Air Forces first instrument flying course begins. Held at RAF Wittering, it employs six Avro 504Ns fitted with blind-flying hoods, turn indicators, and reduced dihedral to decrease inherent stability.
 September 7 – Herbert Clayton Wells loses his life during an air contests in Ottumwa.
 September 13 – The United Kingdom wins the Schneider Trophy outright by winning its third consecutive Schneider Trophy race. With the trophy retired, the Schneider Trophy races, begun in 1913, come to an end.
 September 23 – A Pitcairn XOP-1 autogyro conducts landing and take-off trials aboard the United States Navy aircraft carrier . It is the U.S. Navys first experiment with a shipborne rotary-wing aircraft.
 September 29
American inventor Ed Link receives a patent for his "Combination Training Device for Student Aviators and Entertainment Apparatus." Better known as the  Link Trainer, it allows pilots to train safely on the ground for "blind" instrument flying.

October 
 October 1 – KLM begins a regular service between Amsterdam and Batavia by Fokker F.XII. At  this is the longest regular air route in the world at the time.
 October 3 – Brazil reestablishes Brazilian Navy control over naval aviation, creating a naval aviation corps which takes over the control of naval aircraft from the general staff.
 October 3–5 – Clyde Pangborn and Hugh Herndon make the first non-stop flight across the Pacific Ocean, from Samushiro Beach, Japan, to Wenatchee, Washington in 41 hours in Miss Veedol, a Bellanca J-300 Long Distance Special.
 October 17 – The first hook-on test of the U.S. Navys parasite fighter program takes places, as the Curtiss XF9C-1 prototype successfully docks with the dirigible .
 October 27 – The Detroit Aircraft Corporation files for bankruptcy. Eventually, the Lockheed portion of the company is bought out of receivership.
 October 27–28 – As a test of the second Fairey Long-Range Monoplane in preparation for a later attempt at setting a new non-stop distance flight record it, Royal Air Force Squadron Leader Oswald R. Gayford and Flight Lieutenant D. L. G. Bett fly from RAF Cranwell in England to RAF Abu Sueir in Egypt, covering  nonstop in 31 hours.

November 
 The first production R-6 rolls off the assembly line at the N22 factory in Moscow.
 Hillman's Airways is founded. It will begin charter services in December 1931 and scheduled services in April 1932.
 November 20 – The Government of the Philippines creates an office under its Department of Commerce and Communications to handle aviation matters in the Philippines, particularly the enforcement of rules and regulations governing commercial aviation and private flying.

December
 December 5 – Lowell Bayles, winner of the 1931 Thompson Trophy, dies when the Gee Bee Model Z racer he is piloting crashes during a speed run at Wayne County Airport in Detroit, Michigan.
 Hillman's Airways begins flight operations with a charter flight. It will begin scheduled services in April 1932.
 December 29 – As the French aviators Louis Mailloux and Jean Marmoz take off in the Bernard 81 GR Antoine Paillard to attempt to set a new unrefueled non-stop closed-circuit flight distance record, the airplane's propeller hits the ground and its undercarriage collapses. The two men escape the accident with only a few bruises, and the aircraft eventually is repaired.

First flights 
 Aeronca C-1 Cadet
 ANF Les Mureaux 110A.2, prototype of ANF Les Mureaux 113R.2
 ANF Les Mureaux 112GR
 Arado Ar 65
 Arrow Active
 Avro 627 Mailplane
 Beriev MBR-2
 Curtiss-Wright CW-14 Osprey
 Fairchild 22
 Farman F.250
 Focke-Wulf A 38
 Latécoère 300
 Latécoère 440
 Nakajima Army Type 91 Fighter
 Pitcairn PAA-1
 Pitcairn PCA-2
 Westland-Hill Pterodactyl Mk. IV
 Mid-1931 – Grigorovich I-Z
 Autumn 1931 – Stinson Model R

February 
 Couzinet 21
 Farman F.280
 PZL.12 flying boat prototype - designed and built by leading Polish aircraft designer Zygmunt Puławski, the PZL.12 stalls and crashes in Warsaw during its sixth flight a month later on 21 March just after take-off due to a strong wind, killing Zygmunt
 Westland PV-3
 ca. late February – Potez 40
 February 2 – Latécoère 350

March 
 Curtiss XF9C-1, prototype of the Curtiss F9C Sparrowhawk
 Latécoère 490
 March 3
 Fairey Gordon
 Northrop Beta
 March 9 – Blériot 125 F-ALZD
 March 25 – Hawker Fury
 March 28 – Mitsubishi 2MR8

April
 Amiot 140

May 
 Berliner-Joyce XOJ-1, prototype of the Berliner-Joyce OJ
 May 1 – Grigorovich TB-5
 May 22 – Berliner-Joyce XFJ-2

June 
 Curtiss XA-8, prototype of the Curtiss A-8 Shrike
 Curtiss YP-20 Hawk
 Curtiss XP-22 Hawk, prototype of the P-6E Hawk
 Focke-Wulf Fw 47

July 
 Macchi M.C.72
 July 24 – Dornier Do 10

August 
 Bernard 81 GR Antoine Paillard
 August 7 – RWD-5

September 
 Cierva C.24
 Heinkel He 59
 Lockheed-Detroit XP-900, prototype of the Lockheed-Detroit YP-24
 September 29 – Marinens Flyvebaatfabrikk M.F.11

October 
 Avro 643 Cadet
 October 2 – Junkers Ju 49
 October 3 – Latécoère 290
 October 26 – De Havilland Tiger Moth DH.82 prototype G-ABRC
 October 31 – Westland Wallace

November 
 November 25 – Couzinet 33 Biarritz
 November 27 – Fairey Seal
 November 27 – Fokker D.XVII

December 
 December 29 – Grumman XFF-1, prototype of the Grumman FF
 December 29 – Hawker Audax

Entered service 
 Aeronca C-3
 Curtiss-Wright CW-14 Osprey
 Dornier Do Y with the Royal Yugoslav Air Force
 Fairchild 100
 Levasseur R3b with French Naval Aviation aboard the aircraft carrier Béarn
 Nakajima Ki-6 with Japan Air Transport
 Polikarpov I-5 with the Soviet Air Force

May
 May 1 – Ford RR-4, a version of the Ford Trimotor, with the United States Marine Corps (transferred from the United States Navy).

October
 October 27 –  with the United States Navy

November 
 November 19 – Sikorsky S-40 with Pan American

December 
 Nakajima E4N

Retirements
Airco DH.9A by the British Royal Air Force
Avro 566 Avenger
Avro 562 Avis
Bristol F.2 Fighter by the British Royal Air Force
Westland Witch

References

 
Aviation by year